The Neoepiblemidae are an extinct family of hystricognath rodents from South America. The genera Dabbenea and Perumys are now included in Phoberomys. The delineation between Neoepiblemidae and Dinomyidae has historically been unclear, with some genera (such as Phoberomys and Eusigmomys) having varying taxonomic placement. A 2017 study found Phoberomys to be part of the group, while Eusigmomys was found to be part of the Dinomyidae.

Fossils of the family were found in the Colhuehuapian to Huayquerian Pinturas, Sarmiento, Santa Cruz, Cerro Bandera and Ituzaingó Formations and Colhué Huapí Member of Argentina, the Solimões Formation of Brazil, the Pebas Formation of Peru and the Urumaco Formation of Venezuela.

References

Bibliography

Further reading 
 Kramarz, A.G. 2001. Revision of the family Cephalomyidae (Rodentia, Caviomorpha) and new cephalomyids from the early Miocene of Patagonia. Palaeovertebrata 30(1-2):51-88.
 McKenna, Malcolm C., and Bell, Susan K. 1997. Classification of Mammals Above the Species Level. Columbia University Press, New York, 631 pp. 

Hystricognath rodents
Prehistoric rodent families
Miocene first appearances
Miocene extinctions
Miocene mammals of South America
Colhuehuapian
Santacrucian
Friasian
Colloncuran
Laventan
Mayoan
Chasicoan
Huayquerian